Jewel of the Sahara is a 2001 film starring Gerard Butler, Clifford David as the old Francois Renard and Peter Franzén  as the young Francois Renard. Jewel of the Sahara is comedy, fantasy short film directed by Ariel Vromen, who also wrote the screenplay, was the executive producer and edited the film. The film was made by Keyser Productions.

Plot
Set in a French Foreign Legion Camp circa 1954, the film follows the fantasies of a British captain, desperately missing his home and wife. The captain is caught in an embarrassing situation caused by a combination of the monotonous, hot dreary surroundings, not grasping the workings of the Foreign Legion, and his smoldering desire created by his wife's lustful love letters, all of which is befuddled by his use of drugs.

Cast

Gerard Butler  - Captain Charles Belamy
Clifford David  - Old Francois Renard
Peter Franzén  - Young Francois Renard
Ori Pfeffer  - Mahmud
Ralph Lister  - Harold Belamy
Nicholl Hiren  - Sargent
Gian Saragosa  - Gamal
Ari Averbach
Andre Alfa  - Legionnaire #8
Gahl Sasson  - Legionnaire #1
Rodrigo Madrazo  - Legionnaire #2
Tomer Almagor  - Legionnaire #3
Lionel Renard  - Legionnaire #4 (as Leonal Renard)
Gili Pinchuck  - Legionnaire #5
Santiago Barriero  - Legionnaire #6
Kevin Keyser  - Legionnaire #7

References

External links

2000 films
2000 short films
American fantasy comedy films
Films directed by Ariel Vromen
2000s English-language films
2000s American films
Films about the French Foreign Legion
Films set in 1954